Vayres-sur-Essonne (literally Vayres on Essonne) is a commune in the Essonne department in Île-de-France in northern France.  Prior to 1 January 1968, Vayres-sur-Essonne was part of the Yvelines department.

Inhabitants of Vayres-sur-Essonne are known as Vayrois.

See also
Communes of the Essonne department

References

External links

Official website 

Mayors of Essonne Association 

Communes of Essonne